Kuh is an administrative unit, or Union Council, of the Chitral District in the Khyber Pakhtunkhwa province of Pakistan. The district of Chitral is divided into three tehsils and 24 Union Councils. Union Council Koh starts in Shachar and ends in Koghuzi. Its largest section is Mori, which consists Mori Payeen, Mori Lasht and Mori Bala.

References

Chitral District
Tehsils of Chitral District
Union councils of Khyber Pakhtunkhwa
Populated places in Chitral District
Union councils of Chitral District